We Were Here is a 2011 American documentary film about the HIV/AIDS crisis in San Francisco. The film, produced and directed by David Weissman  with editor and co-director Bill Weber, premiered at the Sundance Film Festival in January 2011, with its international festival premiere following at the Berlin International Film Festival in February 2011. The theatrical premiere took place at the Castro Theatre in San Francisco on February 25, 2011.

People interviewed
The film focuses on 5 different interviews of people that had a protagonist role during the epidemic. These people are, in order of appearance:

 Ed Wolf, a counselor to many gay men
 Paul Boneberg, a political activist
 Daniel Goldstein, an HIV+ artist who lost 2 partners to AIDS
 Guy Clark, a dancer who ran a corner flower stand near the Castro, supplying flowers to many funerals
 Eileen Glutzer, a nurse who helped administer clinical trials for antiretroviral drugs

Reception
We Were Here holds a 100% "certified fresh" rating on review aggregator Rotten Tomatoes and a 94 rating on Metacritic, the highest among films of 2011.

Awards

See also
 And the Band Played On (1993)
 How to Survive a Plague (2012)

References

External links
 
 We Were Here on Independent Lens
 

2011 films
2011 documentary films
American documentary films
Documentary films about HIV/AIDS
HIV/AIDS in American films
Documentary films about San Francisco
LGBT history in San Francisco
2010s English-language films
2010s American films